Ladislaus IV may refer to:
 Ladislaus IV of Hungary (1262–1290), a king of Hungary
 Władysław I Łokietek (1260/1-1333), King of Poland who was sometimes numbered IV
 Władysław IV Vasa or Ladislaus IV (1595–1648), a king of Poland